The 28th Acrobatic Gymnastics European Championships was held in Rzeszów, Poland from October 19 to October 22, 2017, at the Podpromie Hall.

Results

Medal table

References

External links
 28th European Championships in Acrobatic Gymnastics
 2017 European Championships in Acrobatic Gymnastics at European Gymnastics

European Acrobatics Championships
2017 in gymnastics
2017 in German sport
Euro